Zeanillus is a genus of ground beetles in the family Carabidae. There are about 10 described species in Zeanillus, found in New Zealand.

Species
These 10 species belong to the genus Zeanillus:
 Zeanillus browni Sokolov, 2016
 Zeanillus carltoni Sokolov, 2016
 Zeanillus lescheni Sokolov, 2016
 Zeanillus montivagus Sokolov, 2016
 Zeanillus nanus Sokolov, 2016
 Zeanillus nunni Sokolov, 2016
 Zeanillus pallidus (Broun, 1884)
 Zeanillus pellucidus Sokolov, 2016
 Zeanillus phyllobius (Broun, 1893)
 Zeanillus punctigerus (Broun, 1914)

References

External links
 iNaturalist

Trechinae